Pauk Airport  is an airport located in Myanmar near Pauk.

Airports in Myanmar